Ignacio de Arruabarrena Fernández (born 16 January 1997) is a Uruguayan professional footballer who plays as a goalkeeper for Portuguese Primeira Liga club Arouca.

Career
In May 2022, De Arruabarrena joined Primeira Liga club Arouca.

Career statistics

References

External links
Profile at Sofa Score

1997 births
Living people
Uruguayan people of Basque descent
Association football goalkeepers
Uruguayan footballers
Montevideo Wanderers F.C. players
Tacuarembó F.C. players
F.C. Arouca players
Uruguayan Primera División players
Uruguayan Segunda División players
Uruguayan expatriate footballers
Uruguayan expatriate sportspeople in Portugal
Expatriate footballers in Portugal